Pisonia ekmani is a species of plant in the Nyctaginaceae family. It is endemic to Cuba.

References

Endemic flora of Cuba
ekmani
Endangered plants
Taxonomy articles created by Polbot